Addiction is the sixth studio album by American R&B singer Chico DeBarge.  It was released by  Kedar Entertainment on July 14, 2009. DeBarge's first album in six years, it debuted and peaked at number 93 on the US Billboard 200 and number 11 on the Top R&B/Hip-Hop Albums chart.

Critical reception

AllMusic editor Andy Kellman rated the album three ouf of five stars and wrote "DeBarge's attempts at staying up with performers half his age – that is, in terms of lyrical salaciousness and references to Patrón –  tend not to be pulled off so well. Nevertheless, this set should please the followers who were a little put off by the haziness of 2003's (actually pretty great) Free." Tyler Lewis from PopMatters called the album the "strongest contemporary soul record of the year so far (along with Maxwell's BLACKsummers'night) and a beautiful re-introduction to a major, unsung talent." He remarked that "if there is any problem with the album, it is that a handful of songs just sound pretty run-of-the-mill next to the other songs I’ve referenced. Though they aren’t necessarily bad songs, they are aggressively average enough to keep Addiction from being the masterpiece it clearly could have been."

Track listing

Sample credits
"I Forgot Ur Name" samples from "Never Too Much" (1981) as written and performed by Luther Vandross.

Charts

Release history

References 

Chico DeBarge albums
2009 albums